Saul Hallap (10 December 1897 – 18 July 1941) was an Estonian middleweight weightlifter who won a world title in 1922 and placed ninth at the 1924 Summer Olympics. After retiring from competitions he worked as a circus performer and masseur. He was killed during World War II together with his partner, the circus acrobat Alma Kaal. Since 2002 a memorial weightlifting tournament has been held in Tartu in his honor.

References

1897 births
1941 deaths
Olympic weightlifters of Estonia
Weightlifters at the 1924 Summer Olympics
Estonian male weightlifters
Estonian military personnel killed in action
World Weightlifting Championships medalists
Estonian people executed by the Soviet Union